Coulometry determines the amount of matter transformed during an electrolysis reaction by measuring the amount of electricity (in coulombs) consumed or produced. It can be used for precision measurements of charge, and the amperes even used to have a coulometric definition. However, today coulometry is mainly used for analytical applications. Coulometry is a group of techniques in analytical chemistry.  It is named after Charles-Augustin de Coulomb.

There are two basic categories of coulometric techniques.  Potentiostatic coulometry involves holding the electric potential constant during the reaction using a potentiostat.  The other, called coulometric titration or amperostatic coulometry, keeps the current (measured in amperes) constant using an amperostat.

Potentiostatic coulometry

Potentiostatic coulometry is a technique most commonly referred to as "bulk electrolysis".  The working electrode is kept at a constant potential and the current that flows through the circuit is measured.  This constant potential is applied long enough to fully reduce or oxidize all of the electroactive species in a given solution.  As the electroactive molecules are consumed, the current also decreases, approaching zero when the conversion is complete.  The sample mass, molecular mass, number of electrons in the electrode reaction, and number of electrons passed during the experiment are all related by Faraday's laws.  It follows that, if three of the values are known, then the fourth can be calculated.

Bulk electrolysis is often used to unambiguously assign the number of electrons consumed in a reaction observed through voltammetry.  It also has the added benefit of producing a solution of a species (oxidation state) which may not be accessible through chemical routes.  This species can then be isolated or further characterized while in solution.

The rate of such reactions is not determined by the concentration of the solution, but rather the mass transfer of the electroactive species in the solution to the electrode surface.  Rates will increase when the volume of the solution is decreased, the solution is stirred more rapidly, or the area of the working electrode is increased.  Since mass transfer is so important the solution is stirred during a bulk electrolysis.  However, this technique is generally not considered a hydrodynamic technique, since a laminar flow of solution against the electrode is neither the objective nor outcome of the stirring.

The extent to which a reaction goes to completion is also related to how much greater the applied potential is than the reduction potential of interest.  In the case where multiple reduction potentials are of interest, it is often difficult to set an electrolysis potential a "safe" distance (such as 200 mV) past a redox event.  The result is incomplete conversion of the substrate, or else conversion of some of the substrate to the more reduced form.  This factor must be considered when analyzing the current passed and when attempting to do further analysis/isolation/experiments with the substrate solution.

An advantage to this kind of analysis over electrogravimetry is that it does not require that the product of the reaction be weighed.  This is useful for reactions where the product does not deposit as a solid, such as the determination of the amount of arsenic in a sample from the electrolysis of arsenous acid (H3AsO3) to arsenic acid (H3AsO4).

Coulometric titration

Coulometric titrations use a constant current system to accurately quantify the concentration of a species.  In this experiment, the applied current is equivalent to a titrant.  Current is applied to the unknown solution until all of the unknown species is either oxidized or reduced to a new state, at which point the potential of the working electrode shifts dramatically.  This potential shift indicates the endpoint.  The magnitude of the current (in amperes) and the duration of the current (seconds) can be used to determine the moles of the unknown species in solution.   When the volume of the solution is known, then the molarity of the unknown species can be determined.

Advantages of Coulometric Titration

Coulometric titration has the advantage that constant current sources for the generation of titrants are relatively easy to make. 
 The electrochemical generation of a titrant is much more sensitive and can be much more accurately controlled than the mechanical addition of titrant using a burette drive. For example, a constant current flow of 10 µA for 100ms is easily generated and corresponds to about 10 micrograms of titrant. 
 The preparation of standard solutions and titer determination is of course no longer necessary.
 Chemical substances that are unstable or difficult to handle because of their high volatility or reactivity in solution can also very easily be used as titrants. Examples are bromine, chlorine, Ti3+, Sn2+, Cr2+, and Karl Fischer reagents (iodine).
 Coulometric titration can also be performed under inert atmosphere or be remotely controlled e.g. with radioactive substances.

Applications

Karl Fischer reaction

The Karl Fischer reaction uses a coulometric titration to determine the amount of water in a sample.  It can determine concentrations of water on the order of milligrams per liter.  It is used to find the amount of water in substances such as butter, sugar, cheese, paper, and petroleum.

The reaction involves converting solid iodine into hydrogen iodide in the presence of sulfur dioxide and water.  Methanol is most often used as the solvent, but ethylene glycol and diethylene glycol also work. Pyridine is often used to prevent the buildup of sulfuric acid, although the use of imidazole and diethanolamine for this role are becoming more common.  All reagents must be anhydrous for the analysis to be quantitative.  The balanced chemical equation, using methanol and pyridine, is:

In this reaction, a single molecule of water reacts with a molecule of iodine.  Since this technique is used to determine the water content of samples, atmospheric humidity could alter the results.  Therefore, the system is usually isolated with drying tubes or placed in an inert gas container.  In addition, the solvent will undoubtedly have some water in it so the solvent’s water content must be measured to compensate for this inaccuracy.

To determine the amount of water in the sample, analysis must first be performed using either back or direct titration.  In the direct method, just enough of the reagents will be added to completely use up all of the water.  At this point in the titration, the current approaches zero.  It is then possible to relate the amount of reagents used to the amount of water in the system via stoichiometry.  The back-titration method is similar, but involves the addition of an excess of the reagent.  This excess is then consumed by adding a known amount of a standard solution with known water content.  The result reflects the water content of the sample and the standard solution.  Since the amount of water in the standard solution is known, the difference reflects the water content of the sample.

Determination of film thickness

Coulometry can be used in the determination of the thickness of metallic coatings.  This is performed by measuring the quantity of electricity needed to dissolve a well-defined area of the coating.  The film thickness  is proportional to the constant current , the molecular weight  of the metal, the density  of the metal, and the surface area :

The electrodes for this reaction are often platinum electrode and an electrode that relates to the reaction.  For tin coating on a copper wire, a tin electrode is used, while a sodium chloride-zinc sulfate electrode would be used to determine the zinc film on a piece of steel.  Special cells have been created to adhere to the surface of the metal to measure its thickness.  These are basically columns with the internal electrodes with magnets or weights to attach to the surface.  The results obtained by this coulometric method are similar to those achieved by other chemical and metallurgic techniques.

Coulometers

Electronic coulometer
The electronic coulometer is based on the application of the operational amplifier in the "integrator"-type circuit. The current passed through the resistor R1 makes a potential drop which is integrated by operational amplifier on the capacitor plates; the higher current, the larger the potential drop.   The current need not be constant.  In such scheme Vout is proportional of the passed charge. Sensitivity of the coulometer can be changed by choosing of the appropriate value of R1.

Electrochemical coulometers

There are three common types of coulometers based on electrochemical processes:
 Copper coulometer
 Mercury coulometer
 Hofmann voltameter

"Voltameter" is a synonym for "coulometer".

References

Bibliography

External links
IUPAC Gold Book:  coulometric detection method
Coulometry at the University of Akron

Electroanalytical methods